The men's doubles tournament of the 2021 BWF World Championships took place from 12 to 19 December 2021 at the Palacio de los Deportes Carolina Marín at Huelva.

Seeds

The seeding list is based on the World Rankings of 23 November 2021.

 Marcus Fernaldi Gideon / Kevin Sanjaya Sukamuljo (withdrew)
 Hendra Setiawan / Mohammad Ahsan (withdrew)
 Lee Yang / Wang Chi-lin (quarter-finals)
 Aaron Chia / Soh Wooi Yik (third round)
 Takuro Hoki / Yugo Kobayashi (champions)
 Fajar Alfian / Muhammad Rian Ardianto (withdrew)
 Kim Astrup / Anders Skaarup Rasmussen (semi-finals)
 Satwiksairaj Rankireddy / Chirag Shetty (third round)

<li> Ong Yew Sin / Teo Ee Yi (semi-finals)
<li> Goh V Shem / Tan Wee Kiong (quarter-finals)
<li> Vladimir Ivanov / Ivan Sozonov (third round)
<li> Mark Lamsfuß / Marvin Seidel (quarter-finals)
<li> Ben Lane / Sean Vendy (second round)
<li> Goh Sze Fei / Nur Izzuddin (third round)
<li> Lu Ching-yao / Yang Po-han (withdrew)
<li> He Jiting / Tan Qiang (final)

Draw

Finals

Top half

Section 1

Section 2

Bottom half

Section 3

Section 4

References

2021 BWF World Championships